Berdy or Berdi may refer to:

People
Berdi Kerbabayev (1894–1974), Soviet Turkmen writer
Berdi Şamyradow (b. 1982), Turkmen association football player
Sean Berdy (b. 1993), American actor

Places
Berdy (Orenburg), a former work settlement in Orenburg Oblast; since 1959—a part of the city of Orenburg
Berdy (rural locality), a village in Kozelsky District of Kaluga Oblast, Russia